Gonodactylellus is a genus of mantis shrimp. It contains the following species:

 Gonodactylellus affinis (de Man, 1902)
 Gonodactylellus annularis Erdman & Manning, 1998
 Gonodactylellus barberi Ahyong & Erdmann, 2007
 Gonodactylellus bicarinatus (Manning, 1968)
 Gonodactylellus caldwelli Erdman & Manning, 1998
 Gonodactylellus choprai (Manning, 1967)
 Gonodactylellus crosnieri (Manning, 1968)
 Gonodactylellus demanii (Henderson, 1893)
 Gonodactylellus dianae Ahyong, 2008
 Gonodactylellus erdmanni Ahyong, 2001
 Gonodactylellus espinosus (Borradaile, 1898)
 Gonodactylellus incipiens (Lanchester, 1903)
 Gonodactylellus kandi Ahyong & Erdmann, 2007
 Gonodactylellus kume Ahyong, 2012
 Gonodactylellus lanchesteri (Manning, 1967)
 Gonodactylellus micronesicus (Manning, 1971)
 Gonodactylellus molyneux Ahyong, 2001
 Gonodactylellus oshea Ahyong, 2012
 Gonodactylellus rubriguttatus Erdman & Manning, 1998
 Gonodactylellus snidvongsi (Naiyanetr, 1987)
 Gonodactylellus spinosus (Bigelow, 1893)
 Gonodactylellus viridis (Serène, 1954)

References

Stomatopoda